Kau Pei Chau is an uninhabited islet located off the coast of Hong Kong Island on its southeastern end, about 50 metres (165 feet) off the tip of Cape D'Aguilar. Administratively, it is part of Southern District. It is located directly south of the Cape D’Aguilar Marine Reserve.

Name 
Kau Pei literally means the thigh of a dog. Its original name in Chinese is Kau Pui, which is a divination tool used in temples to request an answer from the gods in ancient China.

See also

 List of islands and peninsulas of Hong Kong
 Cape D'Aguilar Marine Reserve

References

Uninhabited islands of Hong Kong
Southern District, Hong Kong
Islands of Hong Kong